Bitter Lake may refer to:

Places
 Bitter Lake (Ontario), Canada
 Great Bitter Lake, Egypt
 Battle of Bitter Lakes, a 925 BCE conflict

United States
 Bitter Lake (Day County, South Dakota)
 Bitter Lake (Miner County, South Dakota)
 Bitter Lake (Seattle), a lake in Washington
 Bitter Lake, Seattle, a neighborhood surrounding the lake

Other uses
 Bitter Lake (film), a 2015 BBC documentary film by Adam Curtis
 Bitter Lake National Wildlife Refuge, a refuge in New Mexico

See also
Places with names meaning "bitter lake" in other languages:
Lake Acıgöl, a lake in Turkey
Lake Magadi, a lake in Kenya
Lake Pikrolimni, a lake in Greece